Edington Burtle railway station was a station on the Somerset and Dorset Joint Railway, and served the village of Edington, Somerset, UK.  Originally named Edington Road, with the village two miles away, it became in 1890 the junction for the Bridgwater branch off the Highbridge line and for the next period in its life was known as Edington Junction. After the Bridgwater line closed to passengers in 1952, the station was renamed as Edington Burtle – Burtle is a village to the north of the station, and somewhat closer than Edington. In February 1956 the down platform and signal box was closed. Goods Yard closed on 13 July 1964.  
It closed in March 1966 when the line was shut as part of the Beeching axe.

References

 Somerset Railway Stations, by Mike Oakley. Dovecote Press, 2002.

External links
 Station on navigable O.S. map

Disused railway stations in Somerset
Former Somerset and Dorset Joint Railway stations
Railway stations in Great Britain opened in 1856
Railway stations in Great Britain closed in 1966
Beeching closures in England